Nowhadan (also Romanized as Nowḩadān and Noohdan; also known as Nodan and Nowdān) is a village in Jirhandeh-ye Lasht-e Nesha Rural District, Lasht-e Nesha District, Rasht County, Gilan Province, Iran. At the 2006 census, its population was 392, in 121 families.

References 

Populated places in Rasht County